Nartus grapii  is a species of beetle in family Dytiscidae, found in the Palearctic. This species was formerly a member of the genus Rhantus.

References

Dytiscidae
Beetles described in 1808